Sergio Mocellini (29 March 1936 – 4 December 2004) was an Italian bobsledder who competed during the 1960s. He won the silver medal in the four-man event at the 1963 FIBT World Championships in Igls. Mocellini finished fourth in the four-man at the 1964 Winter Olympics in Innsbruck and he also competed at the 1968 Winter Olympics.

References

External links
Bobsleigh four-man world championship medalists since 1930
Wallenchinsky, David (1984). "Bobsled: Four-man". In The Complete Book of the Olympics: 1896 - 1980. New York: Penguin Books. p. 561.

1936 births
2004 deaths
Bobsledders at the 1964 Winter Olympics
Bobsledders at the 1968 Winter Olympics
Olympic bobsledders of Italy
Italian male bobsledders
People from Franzensfeste
Sportspeople from Südtirol